Richard Browning may refer to:

 Richard Browning (cricketer) (born 1987), English cricketer
 Richard Browning (inventor) (born 1979), English inventor, entrepreneur and speaker
 Richard Browning (politician) (born 1952), member of the West Virginia Senate